is a Japanese former Nippon Professional Baseball pitcher.

References 

1952 births
Living people
Baseball people from Shizuoka Prefecture 
Japanese baseball players
Nippon Professional Baseball pitchers
Hiroshima Toyo Carp players
Japanese baseball coaches
Nippon Professional Baseball coaches